Glow is the second studio album by Jackson and His Computerband. It was released via Warp in 2013.

Critical reception
At Metacritic, which assigns a weighted average score out of 100 to reviews from mainstream critics, the album received an average score of 69% based on 12 reviews, indicating "generally favorable reviews".

Track listing

Personnel
Credits adapted from liner notes.

 Jackson Tennessee Fourgeaud – production, songwriting, composition, performer
 Sami Osta – guitar (1)
 Natas Loves You – vocals, songwriting (1, 13)
 Planningtorock – lead vocals, composition, songwriting, performer (3)
 Cosmobrown – backing vocals (4)
 Mara Carlyle – vocals, performer (5)
 Lisa Lewis - songwriting (7)
 Anna Jean – vocals (7), lead vocals, songwriting, performer (11)
 Philippe Zdar – mixing
 Mike Marsh – mastering
 Raphael Garnier – artwork
 Douglas Lee – artwork
 Marco Dosantos – photography

Charts

References

External links
 

2013 albums
Jackson and His Computerband albums
Warp (record label) albums